The discography of Scottish singer-songwriter Nina Nesbitt consists of 3 studio albums, 8 extended plays (EP), 20 singles and 6 guest appearances. Her debut studio album Peroxide was released on 17 February 2014 via Universal Music Group. It peaked in the United Kingdom at 11th, in Ireland at 40th and in Scotland at 1st. Her second studio album The Sun Will Come Up, The Seasons Will Change was released on 1 February 2019 via Cooking Vinyl. On 13 September 2019, Nesbitt announced the deluxe edition of her sophomore album, The Sun Will Come Up, The Seasons Will Change & The Flowers Will Fall, would be released on 15 November 2019.

Studio albums

Extended plays

Singles

Promotional singles

Other appearances

Music videos

References

Discographies of British artists